Robert Were Fox (5 July 1754 – 1818) was a Quaker businessman who lived in Falmouth.

Life and work 

Fox was born in Fowey, Cornwall, in the United Kingdom, and married Elizabeth Tregelles (1768–1849) in 1788.  The couple had six sons, including Charles Fox of Trebah, Robert Were Fox FRS of Penjerrick Garden and Alfred Fox of Glendurgan. Their daughter, Mariana Fox (1807–1863), married Francis Tuckett of Frenchay and became the mother of the mountaineer Francis Fox Tuckett. Their daughter, Charlotte born in 1799, married Samuel Fox of Tottenham.

The family were Quakers, descended from George Fox of Fowey and his wife, Anna Debell. Robert Were Fox was the son of their son, George Croker Fox, and his wife, Mary Were.  It was George Croker Fox who founded a Falmouth ship-brokering business, which survived into the 21st century.

During the time Robert Were Fox ran the family's ship-brokering business, family business interests expanded into copper-mining, tin-smelting and foundry-work in partnership with the Williams family. In 1794 R. W. Fox was appointed Consul (Diplomatic Representative) by the United States of America for the port of Falmouth.

In 1811, Fox was one of four delegates sent to negotiate with the Post Office headquarters in Lombard Street for the return of the Packet Service station to Falmouth from Plymouth.

Notes and references

Further reading
 Oxford Dictionary of National Biography article by Philip Payton Fox, Robert Were (1754–1818)
 ODNB article by Denise Crook, Fox, Robert Were (1789–1877) accessed 3 Aug 2006
 ODNB article by G. C. Boase, Fox, Charles (1797–1878), revised by Justin Brooke, accessed 6 Aug 2006]
  and U.S. edition,  Barclay Fox was R. W. Fox the Elder's grandson. Pages cited above are from the Introductory essay by R. L. Brett

English businesspeople
People from Fowey
English Quakers
1754 births
1818 deaths
Robert Were